James Olsen may refer to:

 James Olsen (footballer) (born 1981), English footballer
 Jimmy Olsen, a DC Comics character
 Jimmy Olsen (wrestler) (born 1986), American professional wrestler

See also
 James Olson (disambiguation)